Chain Reaction (Polish: Reakcja łańcuchowa) is a 2017 Polish Drama film directed by Jakub Pączek. The release date is September 20, 2017. The film is dedicated to deceased film director Krzysztof Szot. The movie was shot in Warsaw, Poland.

Plot
The "chain reaction" that is the focal point of the movie has its origins in the 1986 Chernobyl disaster. The film's chief protagonist Marta, played by Małgorzata Mikołajczak, and her husband Adam (Tomasz Włosok) plan their wedding. The couple's friend Paweł (Bartosz Gelner), a film director, who after making an irreversible decision sets out an unstoppable set of events.

Cast
Małgorzata Mikołajczak as Marta
Tomasz Włosok as Adam
Bartosz Gelner as Paweł
Wiktoria Stachowicz as Asia
Anna Radwan as Adam's mother
Andrzej Mastalerz as Adam's step-father

Nominations 

 ZŁOTE LWY (Golden lions) – Participation in the broadcast competition – Jakub Pączek
 MŁODZI I FILM (YOUTH AND FILM) Feature Film Debuts Competition – Participation in the main competition – Jakub Pączek
 ORŁY HOLLYWODZKIE (HOLLYWOOD EAGLES) – Participation in the main competition – Jakub Pączek

References

External links
 

2017 films
2017 drama films
Polish drama films
2010s Polish-language films